John Meyers may refer to:

John Meyers (American football) (1940–1998), former American football defensive tackle
John Meyers (swimmer) (1880–1971), American freestyle swimmer and water polo player
John Meyers (loyalist) (1745–1821), Upper Canada businessman and United Empire Loyalist

See also
John Meyer (disambiguation)
John Myers (disambiguation)
Jonathan Rhys Meyers (born 1977), Irish actor and model